Cedric the Forester is a children's historical novel by Bernard Marshall. It was published in 1921 and was a Newbery Honor recipient in 1922.

Plot

Narrated by Sir Dickon Mountjoy, a twelfth-century Norman nobleman, the novel describes his lifelong friendship with Cedric of Pelham Wood, a Saxon yeoman. Cedric the forester saves Sir Dickon's life and is made his squire. The two men become friends and have many adventures. Cedric eventually becomes the best crossbowman in England, and is knighted. Much of the novel is set in the time of King Richard the Lion Hearted, but in the final chapter Cedric plays a pivotal role in the signing of the Great Charter of King John.

References

External links
 Cedric the Forester at Project Gutenberg.
 
A librarian reviews the book. 

1921 American novels
American children's novels
Children's historical novels
Novels set in the 12th century
Newbery Honor-winning works
1921 children's books